Airvault is a commune in the Deux-Sèvres department in the Nouvelle-Aquitaine region in western France. It is located on the River Thouet.

On 1 January 2019, the former commune of Tessonnière was merged into Airvault.

Historical sites

A Romanesque bridge over the Thouet leads into the town. The Saint Pierre church in the center of town was built around 975 AD by Aldéarde, the wife of viscount Herbert I of Thouars. Rebuilt in the 11th and 12th centuries, the church was used as a stop for pilgrims on their way to Santiago de Compostela. An underground fountain is located under the square in front of the church. One block from the church is the abbey, which houses a museum of traditional arts and crafts. In the vicinity of the church, timber-framed houses border narrow medieval streets. A medieval castle, the Château d'Airvault, overlooks the church.

Trivia
François-Marie Arouet might have chosen his pen name, Voltaire, by inverting the syllables of the word “Airvault”. Although this is largely unsubstantiated, one of Voltaire's parents allegedly owned property in the area.

Airvault hosts a yearly didgeridoo, Jew's harp, and overtone singing festival Rêve de l'Aborigène.

See also
 Communes of the Deux-Sèvres department

References

Communes of Deux-Sèvres